Epsilon Librae (ε Lib) is the Bayer designation for a binary star system in the zodiac constellation Libra. With an apparent visual magnitude of 4.922, it is bright enough to be seen with the naked eye. Based upon an annual parallax shift of 32.02 mas, it is located about 102 light years away from the Sun.

This is a single-lined spectroscopic binary star system. The pair orbit each other with a period of 226.9 days and an eccentricity of 0.66. The semimajor axis of their orbit is estimated to be 0.85 AU, or 85% of the distance from the Earth to the Sun. The primary, component A, has been catalogued with stellar classifications of F3 V and F5 IV, suggesting that it is an F-type star that either belongs to the main sequence or has evolved into a subgiant as the hydrogen at its core nears exhaustion.

The primary has an estimated 1.17 times the mass of the Sun and 1.5 times the Sun's radius. It is around 1.5 billion years old and is spinning with a projected rotational velocity of 10 km/s. The star radiates 9.3 times the solar luminosity from its outer atmosphere at an effective temperature of 6,552 K. The secondary, component B, has 41% of the Sun's mass.

References

F-type main-sequence stars
Spectroscopic binaries
Libra (constellation)
Librae, Epsilon
BD-09 4138
Librae, 31
137052
075379
5723